King County is a county located in the U.S. state of Texas. As of the 2020 Census, its population was 265, making it the second-smallest county in Texas and the third-smallest county in the United States. King County has no incorporated communities.  Its county seat is the census-designated place (CDP) of Guthrie. The county was created in 1876 and organized in 1891. It is named for William Philip King, who died at the Battle of the Alamo.

History

Native Americans
The Apache and Comanche were early tribes in the area.  The Red River War of 1874-1875 was a United States Army campaign to force the removal of Natives in Texas and their relocation to reservations, to open the region to white settlers.

County established
On August 21, 1876, the Texas legislature formed King County from Bexar County. By 1880 the United States Census counted forty residents in the county.  In 1891, the county was organized.  Guthrie was designated as the county seat.

Early ranchers preserved water by damming canyons and draws to hold the heavy spring rains. In the 1890s windmills became the method of water preservation.  Some of the earliest settlers were Isom Lynn, A. C. Tackett, Brants Baker, and Bud Arnett. The Four Sixes Ranch. was established in 1902 by Samuel Burk Burnet. The formerly-named Pitchfork Land and Cattle Company was organized in 1883, and SMS ranches were established during the same time frame.  The 6666 (called Four Sixes Ranch), also founded in 1883, was managed from 1965 to 1986 by George Humphreys, who was also affiliated with the National Ranching Heritage Center in Lubbock.

Dumont was formed in the late 19th century. By that time, farmers began to share the land with ranchers. Cotton was the leading crop for a time, followed by corn, sorghum, and fruit trees.

Oil was discovered in the county in 1943. By January 1, 1991, almost  of oil had been pumped from King County lands since the first wells were drilled.

Geography

Major highways
   U.S. Highway 82 / State Highway 114
  U.S. Highway 83
  State Highway 222

Adjacent counties
 Cottle County (north)
 Foard County (northeast)
 Knox County (east)
 Stonewall County (south)
 Dickens County (west)
 Haskell County (southeast)

Demographics

Note: the US Census treats Hispanic/Latino as an ethnic category. This table excludes Latinos from the racial categories and assigns them to a separate category. Hispanics/Latinos can be of any race.

As of the census of 2000, there were 356 people, 108 households, and 88 families residing in the county. The population density was 0.39 people per square mile (0.15/km2). There were 174 housing units at an average density of 0.19 per square mile (0.07/km2). The racial makeup of the county was 94.10% White, 1.12% Native American, 3.09% from other races, and 1.69% from two or more races. 9.55% of the population were Hispanic or Latino of any race.

There were 108 households, out of which 41.70% had children under the age of 18 living with them, 79.60% were married couples living together, 1.90% had a female householder with no husband present, and 17.60% were non-families. 16.70% of all households were made up of individuals, and 1.90% had someone living alone who was 65 years of age or older. The average household size was 2.77 and the average family size was 3.12.

In the county, the population was spread out, with 33.70% under the age of 18, 3.70% from 18 to 24, 29.50% from 25 to 44, 22.80% from 45 to 64, and 10.40% who were 65 years of age or older. The median age was 37 years. For every 100 females, there were 95.60 males. For every 100 females age 18 and over, there were 100.00 males.

The median income for a household in the county was $35,625, and the median income for a family was $36,875. Males had a median income of $21,389 versus $30,179 for females. The per capita income for the county was $12,321. 20.70% of the population and 17.90% of families were below the poverty line. Out of the total people living in poverty, 23.00% are under the age of 18 and 31.60% are 65 or older.

Politics
King County was once a strongly Democratic county even by Solid South standards. In 1948, 95.85 percent of voters supported Harry S. Truman, in 1960 76.9 percent of voters chose John F. Kennedy and in 1964, 84.1 percent of voters supported Lyndon Johnson. The county also voted for Hubert Humphrey by a plurality in 1968, with  48.7 percent supporting Humphrey while 31.7 percent voted for George Wallace and a mere 19.6 percent voted for Richard Nixon.

However, the county has shifted strongly Republican since the 1980s. The last Democratic presidential nominee to win over twenty percent of the vote in King County was Bill Clinton in 1996. In 2016, by percentage of votes, it was the second most Republican county in the entire country, only being surpassed by Roberts County, Texas.

In the 2004 presidential election, 87.8 percent (137 votes) supported incumbent U.S. President George W. Bush, a Republican, whereas only 11.5 percent (18 votes) backed the Democratic challenger, U.S. Senator John Kerry.

In the 2008 presidential election, 93.2 percent (151 votes) supported the Republican, Senator John McCain, whereas only 4.9 percent (8 votes) backed the Democrat, Senator Barack Obama. Of all United States counties, King had the largest percentage of support for  McCain.

In the 2012 presidential election, President Obama fared even worse in King County.  His Republican challenger, Mitt Romney, received 139 votes in the county (amounting to 95.9% of the county's total votes in the presidential election), while President Obama received only 5 votes — amounting to 3.4 percent of the total.  That percentage was the smallest percentage that President Obama received in any county in the United States in 2012.

In addition, in the 2012 Democratic presidential primaries (in which President Obama faced no serious opposition nationwide), King County was one of two counties that voted for Bob Ely over President Obama.  There were only 7 votes cast in the Democratic presidential primary in King County that year.  Ely won 4 of them, Obama won 1, and two other minor candidates won 1 each.

In the 2016 presidential election, former Secretary of State Hillary Clinton continued the downward trend.  Her Republican challenger, Donald Trump, received 149 votes in the county (93.7% of the county's total votes), while Secretary Clinton received only 5 votes — amounting to 3.1 percent of the total.  Libertarian Party candidate Gary Johnson also received 5 votes.

In 2020, Trump did even better, earning 95% of the vote while Joe Biden slightly improved on Clinton's margin, earning eight votes for 5%. There were no votes for third-party candidates. Biden's 5% of the vote was the highest percentage of the vote a Democrat has received in King County since 2004, when John Kerry took 11.5%. Kerry remains the last Democrat to receive at least a double-digit number of votes in the county.

In the 2012 U.S. Senate election, Republican candidate Ted Cruz received 117 votes (amounting to 95.9% of the county's total vote), while Democratic candidate Paul Sadler received 4 votes, or 3.3 percent of the total.

In the 2014 U.S. Senate election, Republican incumbent Senator John Cornyn received 87 votes (amounting to 96.7% of the county's total vote), while Democratic candidate David Alameel received 1 vote or 1.1 percent of the total. Libertarian Party candidate Rebecca Paddock received 2 votes or 2.2 percent of the total.

In the 2014 Texas gubernatorial election, Republican candidate Greg Abbott received 90 votes (amounting to 96.8% of the county's total vote), while Democratic candidate Wendy Davis received 1 vote or 1.1 percent of the total. Libertarian Party candidate Kathie Glass received 2 votes or 2.2 percent of the total.

Republican Drew Springer Jr., a businessman from Muenster in Cooke County, has since January 2013 represented King County in the Texas House of Representatives.

Economy
The primary industries are raising beef cattle (since the late 19th century), and oil production (since 1943). Corn and cotton are the leading planted farm crops.

Communities
 Dumont
 Finney
 Grow
 Guthrie (county seat; also a CDP)

Education
School districts serving sections of the county include:
 Crowell Independent School District
 Guthrie Common School District

The county is in the service area of Vernon College.

Gallery

See also

 Recorded Texas Historic Landmarks in King County

References

External links
 
 King County Profile from the Texas Association of Counties

 
1891 establishments in Texas
Populated places established in 1891